The 2006 FIBA Europe Under-20 Championship was the ninth edition of the FIBA Europe Under-20 Championship. The city of İzmir, in Turkey, hosted the tournament. Serbia and Montenegro won their second title, the first one with that name (they won the 1998 Championship) as Yugoslavia.

Germany and Belarus were relegated to Division B.

Teams

Squads

Preliminary round
The sixteen teams were allocated in four groups of four teams each.
Note that while Serbia and Montenegro dissolved into Serbia and Montenegro in June 2006, they still competed as one team.

Group A

Group B

Group C

Group D

Quarter-Final round
The eight teams were allocated in two groups of four teams each.

Group E

Group F

Classification round
The eight teams were allocated in two groups of four teams each.

Group G

Group H

Knockout stage

13th–16th playoffs

Belarus and Germany were relegated to Division B.

9th–12th playoffs

5th–8th playoffs

Championship

Final standings

Stats leaders

Points

Rebounds

Assists

All-Tournament Team
  Ersan İlyasova
  Cenk Akyol
  Emir Preldžić
  Nikola Peković
  Luca Vitali

References
FIBA Archive
FIBA Europe Archive

FIBA U20 European Championship
2006–07 in European basketball
2006–07 in Turkish basketball
2006
Sports competitions in Izmir
2000s in İzmir